Governor Carter may refer to:

Charles Bonham-Carter (1876–1955), Governor of Malta
George R. Carter (1866–1933), 2nd Territorial Governor of Hawaii
Gilbert Thomas Carter (1848–1927), Governor for The Bahamas and Barbados and a Governor for Trinidad and Tobago
Jimmy Carter (born 1924), Governor of Georgia
Robert Carter I (1663–1732), Colonial Governor of Virginia from 1726 to 1727
William Arnold Carter (1907–1996), 13th Governor of the Panama Canal Zone